The Megaphonic Thrift is a band composed of four Norwegians from Bergen, Norway. Richard Myklebust, Linn Frøkedal
(The Low Frequency in Stereo), Fredrik Vogsborg (Casiokids) and Njål
Clementsen (The Low Frequency in Stereo) created The Megaphonic Thrift.

The band has toured Europe and North America, and performed at SXSW, CMJ,
The Great Escape, PopKomm and Roskilde, as well as several support shows
for Dinosaur Jr, Stephen Malkmus and the Jicks, Band of Horses and A Place to Bury Strangers.

The Megaphonic Thrift recorded their third full length LP together with producer Jørgen Træen (Kings of Convenience, Jaga Jazzist, Motorpsyho) in renowned Duper studio. The album, "Sun Stare Sounds", was released by YAP Records (Datarock, Noxagt, Ungdomskulen) in 2015.

Discography
 ”Sun Stare Sound” LP (2015)
 ”Moonstruck” 7”. Tuba in Norway, Pad & Pen in Denmark, Sonic Unyon in North  America, ClubAC30 in Europe and Donuts Pop in Japan (2012)
 ”The Megaphonic Thrift” LP. Tuba in Norway, Pad & Pen in Denmark, Sonic  Unyon in North America, ClubAC30 in Europe and Donuts Pop in Japan (2012)
 ”Talks like a Weed king” 7”. Club AC30 (2011)
 ”Decay Decoy” LP. Hype City Recordings in Norway, ClubAC30 in Europe, Pad &  Pen Records in Denmark, Sonic Unyon in North America and Donuts Pop in Japan (2010).
 ”A Thousand Years Of Deconstruction EP”. Spoon Train Audio/Tuba (2009) and  Deadly People Records (2010).
 ”Neues/Break It Down” 7”. Sounds Gold (2010)
 ”Acid Blues” Digital single. Deadly Records (2009)
 ”Acid Blues/Mad Mary” 7”. Sounds Gold (2008)

References

External links
themegaphonicthrift.com
The Megaphonic Thrift facebook page
The Megaphonic Thrift on Soundcloud

Norwegian rock music groups